The 1917 Major League Baseball season was contested from April 11 to October 15, 1917. The New York Giants and Chicago White Sox were the regular season champions of the National League and American League, respectively. The White Sox then defeated the Giants in the World Series, four games to two.

Statistical leaders

Standings

American League

National League

Postseason

Bracket

Managers

American League

National League

External links
1917 Major League Baseball season schedule at Baseball Reference Retrieved January 14, 2018

 
Major League Baseball seasons